

List
As of December 2022, Jazeera Airways of Kuwait operates to the following destinations:

References 

Lists of airline destinations